The Belvidere U.S. Post Office is a historic building located in the Illinois city's downtown business district. It was built in 1911 and represents a good example of Classical Revival architecture. It was added to the National Register of Historic Places as United States Post Office-Belvidere in 2000.

History
The Belvidere U.S. Post Office was constructed in 1911, by Rockford contractor E. Maffioli. A.N. Eason was the construction supervisor for the Treasury Department and the building was constructed according to a schedule which slated completion for September 1, 1911 and occupancy for October 11, 1911. The building was completed on schedule and dedicated on October 11, 1911, attracting a large crowd. The building served as post office until it was put up for sale in 1997. It was sold in 1998 to a member of the public.

Architecture
The Belvidere U.S. Post Office is built in the Classical Revival style of architecture and was designed by Supervising Architect of the U.S. Treasury James Knox Taylor. The building uses a free mix of Classical and Renaissance forms and possesses several elements characteristic of Classical Revival. The interior dome, the broken pediment over the entryway (a Greek Revival form), finely dressed stone work, a monumental scale, and sculptural stone details are all commonly found among Classical Revival styled buildings.

Historic significance
The Belvidere Post Office reflects the designs of post offices promoted by the U.S. federal government in the early 1900s. The post office is an architecturally significant example of Classical Revival architecture and one of Belvidere's most elaborate Classical buildings. The U.S. Post Office Belvidere, Illinois was added to the National Register of Historic Places May 11, 2000.

See also 
List of United States post offices

References

External links 

United States Post Office (Belvidere, Illinois), Property Information Report, Illinois Historic Preservation Agency, accessed May 16, 2008.

National Register of Historic Places in Boone County, Illinois
Belvidere, Illinois
Government buildings completed in 1911
Post office buildings on the National Register of Historic Places in Illinois
Neoclassical architecture in Illinois
Buildings and structures in Boone County, Illinois
1911 establishments in Illinois